The 2018 Judo Grand Prix Tashkent was held in Tashkent, Uzbekistan, from 9 to 11 November 2018.

Medal summary

Medal table

Men's events

Women's events

Source Results

References

External links
 

2018 IJF World Tour
2018 Judo Grand Prix
Sport in Tashkent
2018 in Uzbekistani sport